Trần Hải Lâm (born 4 July 1982) is a retired Vietnamese footballer who played as a centre-back for V-League club SHB Đà Nẵng. He was called up to Vietnam national football team in 2004.

References 

1982 births
Living people
Vietnamese footballers
Association football defenders
V.League 1 players
SHB Da Nang FC players
Vietnam international footballers
People from Bắc Ninh province